The following list of glam metal albums and songs is a list containing albums and songs described by at least one professional source as glam metal or its interchangeable terms, hair metal, lite metal, pop metal, and metal pop.

Albums

1978

Van Halen

1981

Bangkok Shocks, Saigon Shakes, Hanoi Rocks
Breaking the Chains
High 'n' Dry
Too Fast for Love

1982

Dawn Patrol
Self Destruction Blues
Under the Blade

1983

Back to Mystery City
Bark at the Moon
Lick It Up
Mean Streak
Metal Health
Metal Magic
Pyromania
Shout at the Devil
You Can't Stop Rock 'n' Roll

1984

1984
Animalize
Black 'n Blue
Bon Jovi
Condition Critical
Love at First Sting
Out of the Cellar
Slide It In
Stay Hungry
This Is Spinal Tap
Tooth and Nail
Two Steps from the Move
Walkin' the Razor's Edge
W.A.S.P.

1985

7800° Fahrenheit
Asylum 
Invasion of Your Privacy
Midnite Dynamite
Theatre of Pain
Under Lock and Key

1986

5150
Constrictor
Dancing Undercover
Eat 'Em and Smile
The Final Countdown
Grave New World
Look What the Cat Dragged In
Mechanical Resonance
Night Songs
Rage for Order
Slippery When Wet
To Hell with the Devil
Turbo
The Ultimate Sin
Vinnie Vincent Invasion

1987

Appetite for Destruction
Back for the Attack
Crazy Nights
Faster Pussycat
Girls, Girls, Girls
Hit and Run
Hysteria
I Never Said Goodbye
Once Bitten
Permanent Vacation
Pride
Raise Your Fist and Yell
Whitesnake

1988

All Systems Go
Blow My Fuse
Britny Fox
BulletBoys
Cold Lake
G N' R Lies
Kingdom Come
L.A. Guns
Lita
Long Cold Winter
New Jersey
Open Up and Say... Ahh!
Operation: Mindcrime
OU812
Out of This World
Savage Amusement
Second Sighting
Skyscraper
Vixen
Winger

1989

Babylon A.D.
Badlands
Big Game
Blue Murder
Cocked & Loaded
Dangerous Toys
Dirty Rotten Filthy Stinking Rich
Dr. Feelgood
Eat the Heat
Enuff Z'nuff
Extreme
The Great Radio Controversy
Hot in the Shade
Intuition
Leather Boyz with Electric Toyz
Love + War
No Fuel Left for the Pilgrims
Not Fakin' It
Psycho Cafe
Pump
Skid Row
Slip of the Tongue
Sonic Temple
Trash
...Twice Shy
Wake Me When It's Over

1990

After the Rain
Alias
Blackout in the Red Room
Cherry Pie
Crazy World
Empire
Flesh & Blood
Pornograffitti
Stick It to Ya
Tattooed Millionaire

1991

 Freakshow
Hey Stoopid
Lean Into It
A Little Ain't Enough
The Nymphs
Psychotic Supper
Strength
Use Your Illusion I
 Use Your Illusion II

1992

Adrenalize
Dog Eat Dog
Generation Terrorists
Keep the Faith
The Lizard

1993

Exposed
Gold Against the Soul

Songs

0-9
10,000 Lovers (In One)
18 and Life

A
Alone Again
Angel
Animal
Armageddon It

B
Bad Medicine
The Ballad of Jayne
Big City Nights
Black Cat
Born to Be My Baby
Bringin' On the Heartbreak

C
Can't Get Enuff
Cherry Pie
Close My Eyes Forever
Crazy
Crazy Crazy Nights
Crying in the Rain
Cry Tough
Cum on Feel the Noize

D
Don't Close Your Eyes
Don't Go Away Mad (Just Go Away)
Don't Know What You Got (Till It's Gone)
Don't Treat Me Bad
Don't You Ever Leave Me
Down Boys
Dude (Looks Like a Lady)
Dr. Feelgood
Dream Warriors
Dreams

E
Edge of a Broken Heart
Edison's Medicine
Every Rose Has Its Thorn

F
Fallen Angel
Fantasy
The Final Countdown
Fly High Michelle
Fly to the Angels
Fool for Your Loving

G
Get the Funk Out
Girls, Girls, Girls
Girlschool
Gypsy Road

H
Heaven
Heaven's on Fire
Here I Go Again
High Enough
Home Sweet Home
Hot for Teacher
House of Pain
Hysteria

I
I Remember You
I Saw Red
I Wanna Be Somebody
I Wanna Rock
I'll Be There for You
I'll Never Let You Go
I'll See You in My Dreams
I'll Sleep When I'm Dead
In and Out of Love
In My Dreams
Into the Fire
Is This Love

J
Janie's Got a Gun
Jet City Woman
Jump

K
Keep the Faith
Kickstart My Heart
Kiss Me Deadly

L
Lay It Down
Lay Your Hands on Me
Lick It Up
Live Wire
Livin' on a Prayer
Love Bites
Love in an Elevator
Love of a Lifetime
Love Song

M
Metal Health (Bang Your Head)
Miles Away
More Than Words

N
New Thing
No More Tears
No One Like You
Nobody's Fool
Nothin' But a Good Time

O
Once Bitten, Twice Shy
The Other Side

P
Panama
Paradise City
Patience
Photograph
Poison
Pour Some Sugar on Me

R
Rag Doll
Rock of Ages
Rock You Like a Hurricane
Round and Round
Runaway

S
Same Ol' Situation (S.O.S.)
Seventeen
Shelter Me
Shut Up and Dance
Silent Lucidity
Sister Christian
Slave to the Grind
Smokin' in the Boys Room
Something to Believe In
Sometimes She Cries
Still Loving You
Still of the Night
Summertime Girls
Sweet Child o' Mine

T
Talk Dirty to Me
Tears Are Falling
To Be with You
Top of the World
Too Young to Fall in Love
Tragedy
Turbo Lover
Turn Up the Radio

U
Uncle Tom's Cabin
Unskinny Bop
Up All Night

W
Wait
Wanted Dead or Alive
Way Cool Jr.
Welcome to the Jungle
We're Not Gonna Take It
When It's Love
When the Children Cry
When You Close Your Eyes
Wind of Change
Without You
Why Can't This Be Love

Y
Yankee Rose
(You Can Still) Rock in America
You Give Love a Bad Name
(You Make Me) Rock Hard
Your Mama Don't Dance
Youth Gone Wild

Revival albums

American Hardcore (1996)
Euphoria (1999)
Live Era '87–'93 (1999)
Shrinking Violet (1999)
Cocked & Re-Loaded (2000)
Just Push Play (2001)
Rest in Sleaze (2005)
Feel the Steel (2009)
Balls Out (2011)

See also
Glam metal
List of glam metal bands and artists

References 

Bibliography

 
 

 
 
Glam
Glam